Anthene quadricaudata is a butterfly in the family Lycaenidae. It is found in Cameroon, the Republic of the Congo and Uganda.

References

Butterflies described in 1926
Anthene